Piemontese (English Piedmontese) is a Romance language spoken in northwestern Italy.

Piemontese may also refer to:

 People or things relating to Piedmont ( in Italian)
 Piemontese cattle
 Tarocco Piemontese, a tarot card deck

See also
 
 French frigate Piémontaise (1804)
 Piedmontese (disambiguation)